A spree killer is someone who commits a criminal act that involves two or more murders or homicides in a short time, often in multiple locations. The United States Bureau of Justice Statistics defines a spree killing as "killings at two or more locations with almost no time break between murders".

Definition  

According to the Federal Bureau of Investigation (FBI), the general definition of "spree killer" is a person (or more than one person) who commits two or more murders without a cooling-off period; the lack of a cooling-off period marks the difference between a spree killer and a serial killer. The category has, however, been found to be of no real value to law enforcement, because of definitional problems relating to the concept of a "cooling-off period". Serial killers commit separate murders, happening at different times. Mass murderers are defined by one incident, with no distinctive period between the murders.

How to distinguish a spree killer from a mass murderer, or a serial killer, is subject to considerable debate, and the terms are not consistently applied even within the academic literature.  For example, The Encyclopedia of Crime and Punishment lists five different categories of spree killers and cites Mark O. Barton as an example of the second one. He is also noted alongside mass murderers, such as Patrick Sherrill, in the respective entry about mass murder. In The Anatomy Of Motive, John E. Douglas cites Charles Starkweather and Andrew Cunanan as examples of spree killers, while Jack Levin calls Starkweather a mass murderer and Cunanan a serial killer.

In Controversial Issues in Criminology, Fuller and Hickey write that "[t]he element of time involved between murderous acts is primary in the differentiation of serial, mass, and spree murderers", later elaborating those spree killers "will engage in the killing acts for days or weeks" while the "methods of murder and types of victims vary". Andrew Cunanan is given as an example of spree killing, while Charles Whitman is mentioned in connection with mass murder and Jeffrey Dahmer with serial killing.

In Serial Murder, Ronald M. Holmes and StephenT. Holmes define spree murder as "the killing of three or more people within a 30-day period" and add that killing sprees are "usually accompanied by the commission of another felony." They cite Charles Starkweather and the Beltway Snipers as examples of spree killers.  

Ronald and Stephen Holmes define serial murder as "the killing of three or more people over a period of more than 30 days, with a significant cooling-off period between the killings."  Under this definition, Andrew Cunanan would be categorized as a serial killer and not a spree killer.

Douglas wrote that the identity of serial killers is generally unknown until they are caught, and a mass murderer's identity is learned only after they have committed the crime. The identity of the spree killer, on the other hand, usually becomes known by police while the spree is still in progress.

Another term, rampage killer, has sometimes been used to describe spree killers.

See also 
 Active shooter
 Going postal
 Gun Violence Archive
 List of rampage killers
 Mass shooting
 Massacre
 Running amok
 Thrill killing

References

Further reading 

 

Murder